George R. Cole (February 24, 1906 – January 24, 1978) was an American football player, coach, and college athletics administrator. He served as the head football coach at the College of the Ozarks—now known as the University of the Ozarks—in Clarksville, Arkansas from  1930 to 1933 and the University of Arkansas in 1942, compiling a record of 3–7. Cole was also the athletic  director at Arkansas from 1970 to 1973.

Biography
Cole was born in 1906 in Bauxite, Arkansas. He played quarterback for the Arkansas football team. In 1927, he was selected to the All-Southwest Conference team. During the 1927 season, he broke the school's single season scoring record, which stood until 1965. During his career, he scored 185 points, scoring 22 touchdowns, and making seven field goals. He also played baseball during his college career.

After graduating from Arkansas, Cole coached high school football at Warren High School, then moved to College of the Ozarks (now University of the Ozarks). In 1934, he became an assistant coach at Arkansas, while Fred Thomsen was head coach.

In his only season, he compiled a 3–7 record. After 1942, he left Arkansas to serve in World War II. He returned to Arkansas following the war as an assistant coach. He served in various on-field capacities as a coach, recruiter, and scout until he moved to administrative work in 1958. He replaced John Barnhill as athletic director in 1970. Six years later, Cole retired.

Cole was selected to the Arkansas Sports Hall of Fame in 1963, and, in 1974, he was selected to the Collegiate Athletic Directors Hall of Fame. He died on January 24, 1978, in Fayetteville, Arkansas.

Head coaching record

College

References

External links
 

1906 births
1978 deaths
American football quarterbacks
United States Navy personnel of World War II
Arkansas Razorbacks athletic directors
Arkansas Razorbacks baseball coaches
Arkansas Razorbacks football players
Ozarks Eagles athletic directors
Ozarks Mountaineers football coaches
High school football coaches in Arkansas
United States Navy officers
People from Bauxite, Arkansas
Players of American football from Arkansas
Baseball players from Arkansas